Walter Karl Ernst August von Reichenau (8 October 1884 – 17 January 1942) was a field marshal in the Wehrmacht of Nazi Germany during World War II. Reichenau commanded the 6th Army, during the invasions of Belgium and France. During Operation Barbarossa, the invasion of the Soviet Union, he continued to command the 6th Army as part of Army Group South as it captured Ukraine and advanced deep into Russia.

While in command of the 6th Army during Operation Barbarossa in 1941, he issued the notorious Severity Order which encouraged German soldiers to murder Jewish  civilians on the Eastern Front. Reichenau's troops cooperated with the SS Einsatzgruppen in the commission of the massacre of over 33,000 Jews at Babi Yar, and assisted with other crimes against humanity that occurred in areas under his command during the Holocaust.

Early life and service
The son of Prussian Lieutenant General Ernst August von Reichenau (1841–1919), Walter von Reichenau was born in 1884, in Karlsruhe. One of his brothers was Ernst von Reichenau. Walter joined the Prussian Army as an artillery officer cadet on 14 March 1903. He then attended the Prussian War Academy, going on to serve as a staff officer to Max Hoffmann in the First World War. At the beginning of the war, Reichenau was Adjutant of the 1st Guards Field Artillery Regiment and in this position he was promoted to Captain on 28 November 1914 and awarded the Iron Cross 2nd Class and 1st Class over the course of the year. The following year he was transferred to the German General Staff and in the course of 1915 he served as Second Staff Officer (Ib) of the 47th Reserve Division and then as First Staff Officer (Ia) of the 7th Cavalry Division.

Reichenau's early years are described in conflicting terms, as both progressively minded but also brutal, with a history of executing soldiers who were AWOL, even in times of peace. Greatly unconventional, he was an avid outdoors man, spoke English at home and, in contrast to his later activities in Russia, insisted on supporting World War I Jewish veterans' events in full military uniform, even after Hitler came to power. In April 1919 he married the Silesian aristocrat Alexandrine Gräfin Maltzan Freiin zu Wartenberg und Penzlin (1895-1984).

Interwar period
After the war, he joined the Grenzschutz Ost Freikorps as a General Staff officer, serving in Silesia and Pomerania. In 1919 Reichenau joined in the newly established Reichswehr of the Weimar Republic. The officer corps of the new armed forces' was limited to 4,000, and there was to be no General Staff. Reichenau took a post in the Truppenamt, which was the "underground" equivalent of the General Staff formed by Hans von Seeckt. He was promoted to Major in 1924, to Lieutenant Colonel on 1 April 1929 and Colonel on 1 February 1932. In 1930, Reichenau was appointed Chief of Staff to the Inspector of Signals at the Ministry of the Reichswehr. He was later introduced to Hitler in April 1932 by his uncle, a diplomat. Extremely ambitious, he saw the Nazi Party as a revolutionary vessel in which he could propel his career and so broke with the pro-Monarchist politics of the Prussian military caste and became a devoted Nazi.

As an outspoken ally and advocate of Hitler and the Nazi Party, Reichenau soon ran afoul of cabinet member and eventual Chancellor Kurt von Schleicher, who used his authority to have him transferred out of his prestigious posting in Berlin to the headquarters of the military district of East Prussia, a relative backwater. In East Prussia Reichenau served under General Werner von Blomberg, a fellow exile of Schleicher's. Reichenau and Blomberg became political allies within the army and it was Reichenau who introduced Blomberg to Hitler. Blomberg, who had a reputation of being manipulated by Reichenau, was captivated by Hitler and both men soon used their connections with the Nazi party to advance. When Hitler came to power in January 1933, Blomberg became Minister of War. One of his first acts was to promote Reichenau to head the powerful Ministerial Office, acting as liaison officer between the Army and the Nazi Party. He played a leading role in persuading Nazi leaders such as Göring and Himmler that the power of Ernst Röhm and the SA must be broken if the army was to support the Nazi-led government. This led directly to the "Night of the Long Knives" of 30 June 1934.

In 1935, Reichenau was promoted to lieutenant general (Generalleutnant) and was also appointed to command the military forces in Munich. Reichenau was one of Hitler's favorite Generals and his first choice for commander-in-chief of the Heer in 1934, but internal army politics resulted in General Werner von Fritsch getting the post.

Reflecting Reichenau's preference for assignments of political matter, Blomberg sent Reichenau to China in May 1934 to support General Alexander von Falkenhausen's existing military assistance mission.  Konstantin von Neurath, the Foreign Minister, and German ambassador to Japan Herbert von Dirksen, raised objections to Reichenau's posting, fearing that the assignment of an officer of his stature could imperil Germany's relationship with Japan.

In 1938, after the Blomberg–Fritsch affair, in which Fritsch was forced out of the Army command, Reichenau was again Hitler's first choice for head of the Heer, but older leaders such as Gerd von Rundstedt and Ludwig Beck refused to serve under Reichenau, and Hitler again backed down.

World War II

In September 1939, Reichenau commanded the 10th Army during the German invasion of Poland and was the first German to cross the Vistula river, which he swam across. After the campaign he was awarded the Knight's Cross of the Iron Cross for his role as commander of the 10th Army. 

In 1940 he led the 6th Army during the invasion of Belgium and France and later that year Hitler promoted him to Generalfeldmarschall (field marshal) during the 1940 Field Marshal Ceremony.
 
During the German invasion of the Soviet Union, as commander of the 6th Army, he led his army into the heart of Russia during the summer of 1941. The 6th Army was a part of Army Group South, and captured Kiev, Belgorod, Kharkov and Kursk. During its offensive into the Soviet Union, the German army was confronted with a number of superior tank designs. Reichenau inspected the Soviet tanks he came across, entering each tank and measuring its armour plate. According to general staff officer Paul Jordan, after examining a T-34, Reichenau told his officers "If the Russians ever produce it on an assembly line we will have lost the war."

In November 1941 Hitler relieved Field Marshal von Rundstedt from his command of Army Group South and promoted Reichenau to take his place. At his personal recommendation to Hitler, Friedrich Paulus, a protege of Reichenau's and former member of his command staff, was promoted to take over his command of the 6th Army.

Death
Reichenau was a habitual cross-country runner and suffered a stroke after a routine run in cold weather on 14 January 1942. He then sustained severe head injuries when the flight carrying him back to Leipzig for medical attention crashed on landing in Lemberg. Whether he died from his stroke or from injuries sustained in the crash is unknown. He was replaced at Army Group South by Fedor von Bock and given a state funeral.

Nazi political activities and war crimes

Reichenau's uncle was an ardent Nazi and introduced him to Adolf Hitler in April 1932. Reichenau joined the Nazi Party, although doing so was a violation of the army regulations laid down by Seeckt to insulate the army from national politics. Reichenau was an anti-Semite who equated Jewry with Bolshevism and a perceived Asian threat to Europe. Having died in 1942, Reichenau was never convicted of war crimes, but he was part of the German General Staff and High Command of the Armed Forces collectively indicted at Nuremberg. Specifically cited in the indictment was his "Reichenau Order", commonly known as the Severity Order of October 1941, which supported Nazi genocidal policies and advocated for punishment against the “subhuman species” of Jews and the extermination of Jewish Bolshevism in Europe. 

The only objection Reichenau raised to the activities of the Einsatzgruppen in his sector was when they were killing so many Jews, so quickly, that they began to create ammunition shortages in his sector of operations, an issue he addressed by recommending that the SS and SD limit themselves to two bullets per Jew.

Reichenau was in charge of the area of operations in which SS, Einsatzgruppen, and Ukrainian auxiliaries committed the massacre of over 33,000 Jews at Babi Yar. Later that year in August, Reichenau also directly acted to ensure the execution of ninety Jewish children in the Bila Tserkva massacre, after Helmuth Groscurth petitioned him to avert the killings.

References

Citations

Bibliography

 
 
 
 
 
 Görlitz, Walter (1989). "Reichenau," in Correlli Barnett ed., Hitler's Generals. New York: Grove Weidenfeld. pp. 208–18.

External links
 The "Reichenau Order" from October 12, 1941 
English translation of the "Reichenau Order" (Severity Order)
 Biography at DHM.de 
 

1884 births
1942 deaths
German Army World War II field marshals
Recipients of the Knight's Cross of the Iron Cross
Holocaust perpetrators in Russia
Holocaust perpetrators in Ukraine
20th-century Freikorps personnel
Babi Yar
Military personnel from Karlsruhe
German Army personnel of World War I
International Olympic Committee members
Burials at the Invalids' Cemetery